Travinino is a rural locality (a village) in Muromtsevskoye Rural Settlement, Sudogodsky District, Vladimir Oblast, Russia. The population was 58 as of 2010.

Geography 
Travinino is located on the Yastreb River, 12 km south of Sudogda (the district's administrative centre) by road. Dvorishnevo is the nearest rural locality.

References 

Rural localities in Sudogodsky District